Children of the Sun is a 2014 Tunisian drama film directed by Taieb Louhichi. After a night out and about, three youth break into a villa, only to discover that the wheelchair-using owner of the villa is actually inside. Faced by a prospect that they never accounted for, they soon come to know the owner, whom they discover is a writer.

Cast 

 Mohamed Mrad : Fafou
 Mabô Kouyaté : Yanis
 Sarra Hannachi : Sonia
 Hichem Rostom : Kateb
 Jamel Madani

References

External links 

 
 

2014 films
2014 drama films
2010s French-language films
Tunisian drama films